The 145th Army Division(2nd Formation) was formed in November 1969 from detachments of the 47th Army Corps. The division was under direct control of Guangzhou Military Region, while under administrative control from 47th Army Corps.

The division stationed in Yuanjiang, Hunan for agricultural production mission.

In 1970 the division was transferred to Hunan Provincial Military District's control. The division was then composed of:
433rd Infantry Regiment;
434th Infantry Regiment;
435th Infantry Regiment;
Artillery Regiment.

The division was reduced in March 1975 and disbanded in December 1978.

References
中国人民解放军各步兵师沿革, http://blog.sina.com.cn/s/blog_a3f74a990101cp1q.html

Infantry divisions of the People's Liberation Army
Military units and formations established in 1969
Military units and formations disestablished in 1978